Biathlon at the 2007 Asian Winter Games was held at the Beida Lake Skiing Resort in Changchun, China from 29 January to 2 February 2007.

Schedule

Medalists

Men

Women

Medal table

Participating nations
A total of 42 athletes from 7 nations competed in biathlon at the 2007 Asian Winter Games:

References
2007 Asian Winter Games official website

 
2007 Asian Winter Games events
2007
Asian Winter Games
Biathlon competitions in Japan